Mariana Goddard (born 1948) is a South African born, former Swaziland international lawn bowler.

Bowls career
Goddard has represented Swaziland at three Commonwealth Games at the 1986 Commonwealth Games, the 1990 Commonwealth Games and the 1994 Commonwealth Games.

She won a triples silver medal at the 1999 Atlantic Bowls Championships in Cape Town, South Africa.

References

Living people
1948 births
Bowls players at the 1986 Commonwealth Games
Bowls players at the 1990 Commonwealth Games
Bowls players at the 1994 Commonwealth Games
Swazi bowls players